The term is used to describe Botswana, Lesotho, Namibia and Swaziland collectively.

Regions of Africa